Attack of the Saucerman is an action game developed by Fube Industries and published by Psygnosis for the PlayStation console and Microsoft Windows in 1999.

This was the last PlayStation game Psygnosis published as a third-party, before being merged into Sony as a whole.

Reception
PC Gamer gave it a score of 29% and said:

References

External links
 

1999 video games
Action video games
Alien invasions in video games
PlayStation (console) games
Psygnosis games
Windows games
Video games set in the United States
Video games set in London
Video games set in Mexico
Video games set in prehistory
Dinosaurs in video games
Video games set in outer space
Video games about extraterrestrial life
Video games about time travel
Video games developed in the United Kingdom